Ambrosia trifida,  the giant ragweed, is a species of flowering plant in the family Asteraceae. It is native to North America, where it is widespread in Canada, the United States, and northern Mexico.

Distribution
It is present in Europe and Asia as an introduced species, and it is known as a common weed in many regions. Its common names include great ragweed, Texan great ragweed, giant ragweed, tall ragweed, blood ragweed, perennial ragweed, horseweed, buffaloweed, and kinghead.

Description
The tough stems have woody bases and are branching or unbranched. Most leaves are oppositely arranged. The blades are variable in shape, sometimes palmate with five lobes, and often with toothed edges. They are borne on petioles several centimeters long. They are glandular and rough in texture. The species is monoecious, with plants bearing inflorescences containing both pistillate and staminate flowers. The former are clustered at the base of the spike and the latter grow at the end. The fruit is a bur a few millimeters long tipped with several tiny spines.

As a weed
This species is well known as a noxious weed, both in its native range and in areas where it is an introduced and often invasive species. It is naturalized in some areas, and it is recorded as an adventive species in others. It grows in many types of disturbed habitat, such as roadsides, and in cultivated fields. Widespread seed dispersal occurs when its spiny burs fall off the plant and are carried to new habitat by people, animals, machinery, or flowing water. The plant is destructive to native and crop plants because it easily outcompetes them for light.

Herbicide resistant giant ragweed populations were first identified in the late 1990s. Across much of the midwestern United States, populations resistant to group 2 (ALS-inhibitors) and group 9 (glyphosate) are present, though resistant to multiple herbicide modes of action has not yet been documented. There remains concern that herbicide resistance is more widespread than documented and many states like Minnesota offer free screening of giant ragweed for herbicide resistance   For chemical control, use of group 4 (2-4D) and group 10 (glufosinate) are effective.

As an allergen
Also, interest is great in preventing the spread of this plant because its pollen is a significant human allergen. It is one of the most familiar allergenic ragweeds, and residents of different regions begin to experience allergic symptoms as the plant spreads into the area.

Uses
Native Americans had a number of uses for the plant as traditional medicine. The Cherokee used it as a remedy for insect stings, hives, fever, and pneumonia, and the Iroquois used it to treat diarrhea.

Giant ragweed has been used successfully as a compost activator and an ingredient in sheet mulch gardens.

Gallery

References

External links
Ambrosia trifida. NatureServe. 2013.
Reaume, T. Great Ragweed  – Ambrosia trifida. Nature Manitoba. 2011.

trifida
Flora of Canada
Flora of Northeastern Mexico
Flora of Northwestern Mexico
Flora of the United States
Plants described in 1753
Taxa named by Carl Linnaeus